Clubiona is a genus of sac spiders that was first described by Pierre André Latreille in 1804.

Species
 the genus contains 493 species and seven subspecies. These species and subspecies are found in Oceania, Africa, North America, the Caribbean, Asia, Europe, South America, Panama, and on Saint Helena:

C. abbajensis Strand, 1906 – Ethiopia, Somalia, Central, East Africa
Clubiona a. karisimbiensis Strand, 1916 – East Africa
Clubiona a. kibonotensis Lessert, 1921 – East Africa
Clubiona a. maxima Strand, 1906 – Ethiopia, East Africa
C. abboti L. Koch, 1866 – USA, Canada
Clubiona a. abbotoides Chamberlin & Ivie, 1946 – USA
C. aberrans Dankittipakul, 2012 – Thailand
C. abnormis Dankittipakul, 2008 – Thailand, Laos
C. acanthocnemis Simon, 1906 – India
C. achilles Hogg, 1896 – Australia (Central)
C. acies Nicolet, 1849 – Chile
C. aciformis Zhang & Hu, 1991 – China
C. aculeata Zhang, Zhu & Song, 2007 – China
C. adjacens Gertsch & Davis, 1936 – USA
C. aducta Simon, 1932 – Portugal, Spain
C. africana Lessert, 1921 – East Africa
C. akagiensis Hayashi, 1985 – Japan
C. alexeevi Mikhailov, 1990 – Russia (Caucasus)
C. aliceae Chickering, 1937 – Panama
C. allotorta Dankittipakul & Singtripop, 2008 – Thailand
C. alluaudi Simon, 1898 – Mauritius
C. alpicola Kulczyński, 1882 – Europe to Central Asia
C. alticola Dankittipakul & Singtripop, 2008 – Thailand
C. altissimoides Liu, Yan, Griswold & Ubick, 2007 – China
C. altissimus Hu, 2001 – China
C. alveolata L. Koch, 1873 – Samoa, Funafuti, Marquesas Is., Hawaii
C. amurensis Mikhailov, 1990 – Russia (Far East), Japan
C. analis Thorell, 1895 – India, Bangladesh, Myanmar
C. andreinii Caporiacco, 1936 – Italy
C. angulata Dondale & Redner, 1976 – Canada
C. annuligera Lessert, 1929 – Congo, Mozambique
C. anwarae Biswas & Raychaudhuri, 1996 – Bangladesh
C. apiata Urquhart, 1893 – Australia (Tasmania)
C. apiculata Dankittipakul & Singtripop, 2014 – Malaysia (Borneo)
C. applanata Liu, Yan, Griswold & Ubick, 2007 – China
C. aspidiphora Simon, 1910 – South Africa
C. asrevida Ono, 1992 – Taiwan
C. auberginosa Zhang, Yin, Bao & Kim, 1997 – China
C. australiaca Kolosváry, 1934 – Australia (New South Wales)
C. bachmaensis Ono, 2009 – Vietnam
C. bagerhatensis Biswas & Raychaudhuri, 1996 – Bangladesh
C. baimaensis Song & Zhu, 1991 – China
C. baishishan Zhang, Zhu & Song, 2003 – China
C. bakurovi Mikhailov, 1990 – Russia (Far East), China, Korea
C. bandoi Hayashi, 1995 – Japan
C. basarukini Mikhailov, 1990 – Russia (South Siberia, Far East), Mongolia, Japan
C. bashkirica Mikhailov, 1992 – Russia (Urals, West Siberia)
C. batikanoides Barrion, Barrion-Dupo & Heong, 2013 – China
C. bengalensis Biswas, 1984 – India
C. bevisi Lessert, 1923 – South Africa
C. biaculeata Simon, 1897 – South Africa
C. bicuspidata Wu & Zhang, 2014 – China
C. biembolata Deeleman-Reinhold, 2001 – Malaysia (Borneo), Indonesia (Sumatra)
C. bifissurata Kritscher, 1966 – New Caledonia
C. biforamina Liu, Peng & Yan, 2016 – China
C. bifurcata Zhang, Yu & Zhong, 2018 – China
C. bilobata Dhali, Roy, Saha & Raychaudhuri, 2016 – India
C. bipinnata Yu, Zhang & Chen, 2017 – China
C. bishopi Edwards, 1958 – USA, Canada
C. blesti Forster, 1979 – New Zealand
C. bomiensis Zhang & Zhu, 2009 – China
C. boxaensis Biswas & Biswas, 1992 – India
C. brachyptera Zhu & Chen, 2012 – China
C. brevipes Blackwall, 1841 – Europe, Caucasus, Japan?
C. brevispina Huang & Chen, 2012 – Taiwan
C. bryantae Gertsch, 1941 – USA, Canada
C. bucera Yang, Ma & Zhang, 2011 – China
C. bukaea (Barrion & Litsinger, 1995) – Philippines
C. cada Forster, 1979 – New Zealand
C. caerulescens L. Koch, 1867 – Europe, Russia (Europe to Far East), Kazakhstan, China, Japan
C. californica Fox, 1938 – USA
C. calycina Wu & Zhang, 2014 – China
C. cambridgei L. Koch, 1873 – New Zealand
C. campylacantha Dankittipakul, 2008 – Thailand
C. canaca Berland, 1930 – New Caledonia
C. canadensis Emerton, 1890 – USA, Canada
C. canberrana Dondale, 1966 – Australia (New South Wales)
C. candefacta Nicolet, 1849 – Chile
C. capensis Simon, 1897 – South Africa
C. caplandensis Strand, 1907 – South Africa
C. catawba Gertsch, 1941 – USA
C. caucasica Mikhailov & Otto, 2017 – Caucasus (Georgia, Armenia, Azerbaijan, Russia), Turkey
C. chabarovi Mikhailov, 1991 – Russia (Far East)
C. chakrabartei Majumder & Tikader, 1991 – India
C. charitonovi Mikhailov, 1990 – Russia (South Siberia, Far East)
C. charleneae Barrion & Litsinger, 1995 – Philippines
C. chathamensis Simon, 1905 – New Zealand (Chatham Is.)
C. cheni Yu & Li, 2019 – China
C. chevalieri Berland, 1936 – Cape Verde Is.
C. chikunii Hayashi, 1986 – Japan
C. chippewa Gertsch, 1941 – USA, Canada
C. circulata Zhang & Yin, 1998 – China
C. cirrosa Ono, 1989 – Japan (Ryukyu Is.)
C. citricolor Lawrence, 1952 – South Africa
C. clima Forster, 1979 – New Zealand
C. cochleata Wang, Wu & Zhang, 2015 – China
C. complicata Banks, 1898 – Mexico
C. comta C. L. Koch, 1839 – Europe, North Africa, Turkey, Caucasus
C. concinna (Thorell, 1887) – Myanmar
C. congentilis Kulczyński, 1913 – Central Europe to Central Asia
C. conica Dankittipakul & Singtripop, 2014 – Malaysia (Borneo)
C. consensa Forster, 1979 – New Zealand
C. contaminata O. Pickard-Cambridge, 1872 – Israel
C. contrita Forster, 1979 – New Zealand
C. convoluta Forster, 1979 – New Zealand
C. cordata Zhang & Zhu, 2009 – China
C. coreana Paik, 1990 – Russia (Far East), China, Korea
C. corrugata Bösenberg & Strand, 1906 – Russia (Far East), China, Taiwan, Korea, Japan, Thailand
C. corticalis (Walckenaer, 1802) – Europe, Turkey, Caucasus
Clubiona c. concolor Kulczyński, 1897 – Hungary
Clubiona c. nigra Simon, 1878 – France
C. crouxi Caporiacco, 1935 – Karakorum
C. cultrata Dankittipakul & Singtripop, 2014 – Indonesia (Borneo)
C. cycladata Simon, 1909 – Australia (Western Australia)
C. cylindrata Liu, Yan, Griswold & Ubick, 2007 – China
C. cylindriformis Dankittipakul & Singtripop, 2014 – Malaysia (Borneo)
C. dactylina Liu, Peng & Yan, 2016 – China
C. damirkovaci Deeleman-Reinhold, 2001 – Malaysia
C. debilis Nicolet, 1849 – Chile
C. deletrix O. Pickard-Cambridge, 1885 – India, China, Taiwan, Japan
C. delicata Forster, 1979 – New Zealand
C. denticulata Dhali, Roy, Saha & Raychaudhuri, 2016 – India
C. desecheonis Petrunkevitch, 1930 – Puerto Rico
C. deterrima Strand, 1904 – Norway
C. dichotoma Wang, Chen & Z. S. Zhang, 2018 – China
C. didentata Zhang & Yin, 1998 – China
C. digitata Dankittipakul, 2012 – Thailand
C. dikita Barrion & Litsinger, 1995 – Philippines
C. diversa O. Pickard-Cambridge, 1862 – Europe, Caucasus, Russia (Europe to Far East), Kazakhstan, Korea, Japan
C. drassodes O. Pickard-Cambridge, 1874 – India, Bangladesh, China
C. dubia O. Pickard-Cambridge, 1870 – St. Helena
C. dunini Mikhailov, 2003 – Russia (Far East)
C. duoconcava Zhang & Hu, 1991 – China
C. durbana Roewer, 1951 – South Africa
C. dyasia Gertsch, 1941 – USA
C. dysderiformis (Guérin, 1838) – New Guinea
C. elaphines Urquhart, 1893 – Australia (Tasmania)
C. ericius Chrysanthus, 1967 – New Guinea
C. eskovi Mikhailov, 1995 – Russia (Far East)
C. estes Edwards, 1958 – USA
C. esuriens Thorell, 1897 – Myanmar
C. evoronensis Mikhailov, 1995 – Russia (Far East)
C. excavata (Rainbow, 1920) – Australia (Lord Howe Is.)
C. excisa O. Pickard-Cambridge, 1898 – Mexico
C. ezoensis Hayashi, 1987 – Russia (Far East), Japan
C. facilis O. Pickard-Cambridge, 1911 – Britain
C. falcata Tang, Song & Zhu, 2005 – China, Mongolia
C. falciforma Liu, Peng & Yan, 2016 – China
C. fanjingshan Wang, Chen & Z. S. Zhang, 2018 – China
C. femorocalcarata Huang & Chen, 2012 – Taiwan
C. filicata O. Pickard-Cambridge, 1874 – India, Bangladesh, Pakistan, Thailand, Myanmar, Laos, China
C. filifera Dankittipakul, 2008 – Thailand
C. filoramula Zhang & Yin, 1998 – China
C. flavocincta Nicolet, 1849 – Chile
C. foliata Keswani & Vankhede, 2014 – India
C. forcipa Yang, Song & Zhu, 2003 – China
C. frisia Wunderlich & Schuett, 1995 – Europe to Central Asia
C. frutetorum L. Koch, 1867 – Europe to Central Asia
C. furcata Emerton, 1919 – North America, Russia (Middle to East Siberia)
C. fusoidea Zhang, 1992 – China
C. fuzhouensis Gong, 1985 – China
C. gallagheri Barrion & Litsinger, 1995 – Indonesia (Java)
C. germanica Thorell, 1871 – Europe, Caucasus, Russia (Europe to Far East), Central Asia
C. gertschi Edwards, 1958 – USA
C. gilva O. Pickard-Cambridge, 1872 – Israel
C. giulianetti Rainbow, 1898 – New Guinea
C. glatiosa Saito, 1934 – Japan
C. globosa Wang, Chen & Z. S. Zhang, 2018 – China
C. godfreyi Lessert, 1921 – East Africa
C. golovatchi Mikhailov, 1990 – Russia (Europe), Caucasus
C. gongi Zhang, Yin, Bao & Kim, 1997 – China
C. gongshan He, Liu & Zhang, 2016 – China
C. grucollaris Yu, Zhang & Chen, 2017 – China
C. guianensis Caporiacco, 1947 – Guyana
C. haeinsensis Paik, 1990 – Russia (Far East), China, Korea, Japan
C. haplotarsa Simon, 1910 – São Tomé and Príncipe
C. hatamensis (Thorell, 1881) – New Guinea
C. haupti Tang, Song & Zhu, 2005 – China
C. hedini Schenkel, 1936 – China
C. helenae Mikhailov, 2003 – Russia (Far East)
C. helva Simon, 1897 – South Africa
C. heteroducta Zhang & Yin, 1998 – China
C. heterosaca Yin, Yan, Gong & Kim, 1996 – China
C. hexadentata Dhali, Roy, Saha & Raychaudhuri, 2016 – India
C. hilaris Simon, 1878 – Mountains of Spain, France, Italy, Austria, Switzerland, Macedonia and Romania
C. hindu Deeleman-Reinhold, 2001 – Indonesia (Bali)
C. hitchinsi Saaristo, 2002 – Seychelles, French Polynesia (Tuamotu)
C. hoffmanni Schenkel, 1937 – Madagascar
C. hooda Dong & Zhang, 2016 – China
C. hugispaa Barrion & Litsinger, 1995 – Philippines
C. hugisva Barrion & Litsinger, 1995 – Philippines
C. huiming Wang, F. Zhang & Z. S. Zhang, 2018 – China
C. hummeli Schenkel, 1936 – China
C. hundeshageni Strand, 1907 – Indonesia (Moluccas)
C. huttoni Forster, 1979 – New Zealand
C. hwanghakensis Paik, 1990 – Korea
C. hyrcanica Mikhailov, 1990 – Azerbaijan
C. hysgina Simon, 1889 – India
C. hystrix Berland, 1938 – Indonesia (Lesser Sunda Is.), Vanuatu
C. iharai Ono, 1995 – Japan
C. ikedai Ono, 1992 – Japan
C. inaensis Hayashi, 1989 – Japan
C. inquilina Deeleman-Reinhold, 2001 – Malaysia (Borneo)
C. insulana Ono, 1989 – Taiwan, Japan (Ryukyu Is.)
C. interjecta L. Koch, 1879 – Russia (West Siberia to Far East), Mongolia, China
C. irinae Mikhailov, 1991 – Russia (Far East), China, Korea
C. jaegeri Ono, 2011 – Palau Is.
C. janae Edwards, 1958 – USA
C. japonica L. Koch, 1878 – Russia (Sakhalin, Kurile Is.), China, Korea, Taiwan, Japan
C. japonicola Bösenberg & Strand, 1906 – Russia (Far East) to Philippines, Indonesia
C. jiulongensis Zhang, Yin & Kim, 1996 – China
C. johnsoni Gertsch, 1941 – USA, Canada
C. jucunda (Karsch, 1879) – Russia (Far East), China, Korea, Taiwan, Japan
C. juvenis Simon, 1878 – Europe, Uzbekistan
C. kagani Gertsch, 1941 – USA
C. kai Jäger & Dankittipakul, 2010 – Laos
C. kaltenbachi Kritscher, 1966 – New Caledonia
C. kapataganensis Barrion & Litsinger, 1995 – Philippines
C. kasanensis Paik, 1990 – Korea, Japan
C. kastoni Gertsch, 1941 – USA, Canada
C. kasurensis Mukhtar & Mushtaq, 2005 – Pakistan
C. katioryza Barrion & Litsinger, 1995 – Philippines
C. kayashimai Ono, 1994 – Taiwan
C. kiboschensis Lessert, 1921 – East Africa
C. kigabensis Strand, 1915 – East Africa
C. kimyongkii Paik, 1990 – Russia (Far East), China, Korea
C. kiowa Gertsch, 1941 – North America
C. komissarovi Mikhailov, 1992 – Russia (Far East), Korea
C. kowong Chrysanthus, 1967 – New Guinea
C. krisisensis Barrion & Litsinger, 1995 – Philippines, Indonesia (Borneo)
C. kropfi Zhang, Zhu & Song, 2003 – China
C. kuanshanensis Ono, 1994 – Taiwan
C. kularensis Marusik & Koponen, 2002 – Russia (north-eastern Siberia, Far East)
C. kulczynskii Lessert, 1905 – North America, Europe, Kazakhstan, Russia (Europe to Far East), Japan
C. kumadaorum Ono, 1992 – Japan
C. kunashirensis Mikhailov, 1990 – Russia (Sakhalin, Kurile Is.), Japan
C. kurenshikovi Mikhailov, 1995 – Russia (Far East)
C. kurilensis Bösenberg & Strand, 1906 – Russia (Far East), China, Taiwan, Korea, Japan
C. kurosawai Ono, 1986 – Taiwan, Korea, Japan
C. kuu Jäger & Dankittipakul, 2010 – Laos
C. lala Jäger & Dankittipakul, 2010 – Laos
C. lamellaris Zhang, Yu & Zhong, 2018 – China
C. lamina Zhang, Zhu & Song, 2007 – China
C. langei Mikhailov, 1991 – Russia (Far East)
C. latericia Kulczyński, 1926 – Russia (Middle Siberia to Far East), USA (Alaska)
 O. Pickard-Cambridge, 1885 – China (Yarkand)
C. latitans Pavesi, 1883 – Ethiopia, Somalia, Kenya
C. laudabilis Simon, 1909 – Australia (Western Australia)
C. lawrencei Roewer, 1951 – South Africa
C. lena Bösenberg & Strand, 1906 – China, Korea, Japan
C. leonilae Barrion & Litsinger, 1995 – Philippines
C. leptosa Zhang, Yin, Bao & Kim, 1997 – China
C. limpida Simon, 1897 – South Africa
C. limpidella Strand, 1907 – South Africa
C. linea Xie, Yin, Yan & Kim, 1996 – China
C. linzhiensis Hu, 2001 – China
C. lirata Yang, Song & Zhu, 2003 – China
C. littoralis Banks, 1895 – USA, Canada
C. logunovi Mikhailov, 1990 – Russia (Far East)
C. longipes Nicolet, 1849 – Chile
C. luapalana Giltay, 1935 – Congo
C. lucida He, Liu & Zhang, 2016 – China
C. ludhianaensis Tikader, 1976 – India, Bangladesh
C. lutescens Westring, 1851 – Europe, Turkey, Caucasus, Russia (Europe to Far East), Iran, Kazakhstan, Korea, Japan. Introduced to North America
C. lyriformis Song & Zhu, 1991 – China
C. maculata Roewer, 1951 – Australia (Queensland)
C. mahensis Simon, 1893 – Seychelles
C. maipai Jäger & Dankittipakul, 2010 – Thailand
C. mandschurica Schenkel, 1953 – Russia (Far East), China, Korea, Japan
C. manshanensis Zhu & An, 1988 – China
C. maracandica Kroneberg, 1875 – Uzbekistan
C. maritima L. Koch, 1867 – USA, Canada, Caribbean
C. marmorata L. Koch, 1866 – France to Ukraine and Turkey
C. marna Roddy, 1966 – USA
C. marusiki Mikhailov, 1990 – Russia (Far East)
C. maya Hayashi & Yoshida, 1991 – Japan
C. maysangarta Barrion & Litsinger, 1995 – Philippines
C. mayumiae Ono, 1993 – Russia (Far East), Korea, Japan
C. mazandaranica Mikhailov, 2003 – Azerbaijan, Iran
C. medog Zhang, Zhu & Song, 2007 – China
C. melanosticta Thorell, 1890 – Thailand, Indonesia (Sumatra, Krakatau), New Guinea
C. melanothele Thorell, 1895 – Myanmar, Thailand, Laos, Indonesia (Sumatra)
C. meraukensis Chrysanthus, 1967 – Malaysia, New Guinea
C. microsapporensis Mikhailov, 1990 – Russia (Far East), Korea
C. mikhailovi Deeleman-Reinhold, 2001 – Indonesia (Java)
C. milingae Barrion-Dupo, Barrion & Heong, 2013 – China
C. mimula Chamberlin, 1928 – USA, Canada
C. minima (Ono, 2010) – Japan
C. minuscula Nicolet, 1849 – Chile
C. minuta Seo, 2009 – Korea
C. minuta Nicolet, 1849 – Chile
C. mixta Emerton, 1890 – USA, Canada
C. modesta L. Koch, 1873 – Australia (Queensland)
C. moesta Banks, 1896 – USA, Canada, China
C. moralis Song & Zhu, 1991 – China, Taiwan
C. mordica O. Pickard-Cambridge, 1898 – Mexico
C. mujibari Biswas & Raychaudhuri, 1996 – Bangladesh
C. multidentata Liu, Peng & Yan, 2016 – China
C. munda Thorell, 1887 – Myanmar
C. munis Simon, 1909 – Australia (Western Australia)
C. mutata Gertsch, 1941 – USA, Canada
C. mutilata Bösenberg & Strand, 1906 – Japan
C. mykolai Mikhailov, 2003 – Ukraine
C. nataliae Trilikauskas, 2007 – Russia (Far East)
C. natalica Simon, 1897 – South Africa
C. neglecta O. Pickard-Cambridge, 1862 – Europe, Turkey, Caucasus, Russia (Europe to South Siberia), Iran, Central Asia, China, Korea
C. neglectoides Bösenberg & Strand, 1906 – China, Korea, Japan
C. nemorum Ledoux, 2004 – Réunion
C. nenilini Mikhailov, 1995 – Russia (South Siberia)
C. neocaledonica Berland, 1924 – New Caledonia
C. newnani Ivie & Barrows, 1935 – USA
C. nicholsi Gertsch, 1941 – USA
C. nicobarensis Tikader, 1977 – India (Nicobar Is.)
C. nigromaculosa Blackwall, 1877 – Seychelles, Réunion
C. nilgherina Simon, 1906 – India
C. ningpoensis Schenkel, 1944 – China
C. nollothensis Simon, 1910 – South Africa
C. norvegica Strand, 1900 – North America, Europe, Russia (Europe to West Siberia)
C. notabilis L. Koch, 1873 – Australia (Queensland)
C. obesa Hentz, 1847 – USA, Canada
C. oceanica Ono, 2011 – Japan
C. octoginta Dankittipakul, 2008 – Thailand
C. odelli Edwards, 1958 – USA
C. odesanensis Paik, 1990 – Russia (Far East), China, Korea
C. ogatai Ono, 1995 – Japan
C. oligerae Mikhailov, 1995 – Russia (Far East)
C. opeongo Edwards, 1958 – Canada
C. orientalis Mikhailov, 1995 – North Korea
C. oteroana Gertsch, 1941 – USA
C. ovalis Zhang, 1991 – China
C. pacifica Banks, 1896 – USA, Canada
C. pahilistapyasea Barrion & Litsinger, 1995 – Thailand, Indonesia (Borneo), Philippines
C. paiki Mikhailov, 1991 – Russia (Far East)
C. pala Deeleman-Reinhold, 2001 – Indonesia (Moluccas)
C. pallidula (Clerck, 1757) (type) – Europe, Caucasus, Russia (Europe to Far East), Central Asia. Introduced to North America
C. pantherina Chrysanthus, 1967 – New Guinea
C. papillata Schenkel, 1936 – Russia (Far East), China, Korea
C. papuana Chrysanthus, 1967 – New Guinea
C. paralena Mikhailov, 1995 – North Korea
C. parallela Hu & Li, 1987 – China
C. paranghinlalakirta Barrion & Litsinger, 1995 – Philippines
C. parangunikarta Barrion & Litsinger, 1995 – Philippines
C. parconcinna Deeleman-Reinhold, 2001 – Thailand, Indonesia (Borneo)
C. parvula Saito, 1933 – Japan
C. pashabhaii Patel & Patel, 1973 – India
C. peculiaris L. Koch, 1873 – New Zealand
C. phansa Strand, 1911 – Indonesia (Aru Is.)
C. phragmitis C. L. Koch, 1843 – Morocco, Algeria, Europe, Caucasus, Russia (Europe to Far East), Iran, Central Asia, China, Korea
C. phragmitoides Schenkel, 1963 – China
C. pianmaensis Wang, Wu & Zhang, 2015 – China
C. picturata Deeleman-Reinhold, 2001 – Indonesia (Bali)
C. pikei Gertsch, 1941 – USA, Canada
C. pila Dhali, Roy, Saha & Raychaudhuri, 2016 – India
C. plumbi Gertsch, 1941 – USA
C. pogonias Simon, 1906 – India
C. pollicaris Wu, Zheng & Zhang, 2015 – China
C. pomoa Gertsch, 1941 – USA
C. pongolensis Lawrence, 1952 – South Africa
C. pototanensis Barrion & Litsinger, 1995 – Philippines
C. praematura Emerton, 1909 – North America, Russia (Far East)
C. procera Chrysanthus, 1967 – New Guinea
C. procteri Gertsch, 1941 – USA
C. producta Forster, 1979 – New Zealand
C. propinqua L. Koch, 1879 – Russia (Middle Siberia to Far East), North Korea, China
C. proszynskii Mikhailov, 1995 – North Korea
C. pruvotae Berland, 1930 – New Caledonia
C. pseudocordata Dhali, Roy, Saha & Raychaudhuri, 2016 – India
C. pseudogermanica Schenkel, 1936 – Russia (Far East), China, Korea, Japan
C. pseudomaxillata Hogg, 1915 – New Guinea
C. pseudoneglecta Wunderlich, 1994 – Morocco, Algeria, Europe, Caucasus
C. pseudopteroneta Raven & Stumkat, 2002 – Australia (Queensland)
C. pseudosaxatilis Mikhailov, 1992 – Russia (Central Asia, South Siberia), Kazakhstan
C. pseudosimilis Mikhailov, 1990 – Algeria, Portugal, Greece (Crete), Caucasus
C. pterogona Yang, Song & Zhu, 2003 – China
C. puera Nicolet, 1849 – Chile
C. pupillaris Lawrence, 1938 – South Africa
C. pupula Thorell, 1897 – Myanmar
C. pygmaea Banks, 1892 – USA, Canada
C. pyrifera Schenkel, 1936 – China
C. qianhuayuani Barrion, Barrion-Dupo & Heong, 2013 – China
C. qini Tang, Song & Zhu, 2005 – China
C. qiyunensis Xu, Yang & Song, 2003 – China
C. quebecana Dondale & Redner, 1976 – USA, Canada
C. rainbowi Roewer, 1951 – Australia (Lord Howe Is.)
C. rama Dankittipakul & Singtripop, 2008 – India, Thailand, China
C. ramoiensis (Thorell, 1881) – New Guinea
C. rava Simon, 1886 – Senegal
C. reclusa O. Pickard-Cambridge, 1863 – Europe, Turkey, Russia (Europe to South Siberia), Kazakhstan
C. revillioidi Lessert, 1936 – South Africa, Mozambique
C. rhododendri Barrows, 1945 – USA
C. rileyi Gertsch, 1941 – USA
C. riparia L. Koch, 1866 – Russia (Urals to Far East), Mongolia, China, Japan, North America
C. risbeci Berland, 1930 – New Caledonia
C. rivalis Pavesi, 1883 – Ethiopia
C. robusta L. Koch, 1873 – Australia
C. roeweri Caporiacco, 1940 – Ethiopia
C. rosserae Locket, 1953 – Britain, France, Netherlands, Poland, Slovakia, Hungary, Romania
C. rostrata Paik, 1985 – Russia (Far East), China, Korea, Japan
C. rothschildi Berland, 1922 – Ethiopia
C. ruandana Strand, 1916 – East Africa
C. rumpiana Lawrence, 1952 – South Africa
C. rybini Mikhailov, 1992 – Kazakhstan, Kyrgyzstan
C. ryukyuensis Ono, 1989 – Japan (Ryukyu Is.)
C. saltitans Emerton, 1919 – USA, Canada
C. saltuum Kulczyński, 1898 – Austria
C. samoensis Berland, 1929 – Samoa, French Polynesia (Society Is., Austral Is.: Rapa)
C. sapporensis Hayashi, 1986 – Russia (Far East), Korea, Japan
C. saurica Mikhailov, 1992 – Kazakhstan
C. savesi Berland, 1930 – New Caledonia
C. saxatilis L. Koch, 1867 – France to Poland and south-eastern Europe
C. scandens Deeleman-Reinhold, 2001 – Malaysia (Borneo)
C. scatula Forster, 1979 – New Zealand
C. scenica Nicolet, 1849 – Chile
C. semicircularis Tang, Song & Zhu, 2005 – China
C. sertungensis Hayashi, 1996 – Indonesia (Krakatau)
C. shillongensis Majumder & Tikader, 1991 – India
C. sichotanica Mikhailov, 2003 – Russia (Far East)
C. sigillata Lawrence, 1952 – South Africa
C. silvestris Deeleman-Reinhold, 2001 – Malaysia (Borneo)
C. similis L. Koch, 1867 – Europe, Turkey, Caucasus
C. sjostedti Lessert, 1921 – East Africa
Clubiona s. spinigera Lessert, 1921 – East Africa
C. sopaikensis Paik, 1990 – Russia (Far East), Korea
C. sparassella Strand, 1909 – South Africa
C. spiralis Emerton, 1909 – USA, Canada
C. stagnatilis Kulczyński, 1897 – Europe, Caucasus, Russia (Europe to South Siberia), Central Asia
C. stiligera Deeleman-Reinhold, 2001 – Indonesia (Sumatra)
C. straminea O. Pickard-Cambridge, 1872 – Israel
C. subapplanata Wang, Chen & Z. S. Zhang, 2018 – China
C. subborealis Mikhailov, 1992 – Russia (South Siberia, Far East), Mongolia
C. subcylindrica Wang, Chen & Z. S. Zhang, 2018 – China
C. subkuu Yu & Li, 2019 – China
C. submaculata (Thorell, 1891) – India (Nicobar Is.)
C. submoralis Wu, Zheng & Zhang, 2015 – China
C. subnotabilis Strand, 1907 – Australia
C. subparallela Zhang, Zhu & Song, 2007 – China
C. subquebecana Yu & Li, 2019 – China
C. subrama Yu & Li, 2019 – China
C. subrostrata Zhang & Hu, 1991 – China
C. subsultans Thorell, 1875 – Europe, Russia (Europe to South Siberia), Japan
C. subtilis L. Koch, 1867 – Europe, Russia (Europe to Far East), Kyrgyzstan, Korea
C. subtrivialis Strand, 1906 – Ethiopia, East Africa
C. subyaginumai Yu & Li, 2019 – China
C. suthepica Dankittipakul, 2008 – Thailand
C. tabupumensis Petrunkevitch, 1914 – Myanmar
C. taiwanica Ono, 1994 – China, Taiwan
C. tangi Liu, Peng & Yan, 2016 – China
C. tanikawai Ono, 1989 – China, Taiwan, Japan (Ryukyu Is.)
C. tateyamensis Hayashi, 1989 – Japan
C. tenera (Thorell, 1890) – Indonesia (Sumatra, Java)
C. tengchong Zhang, Zhu & Song, 2007 – China
C. ternatensis (Thorell, 1881) – Indonesia (Moluccas)
C. terrestris Westring, 1851 – Europe (without Russia), Turkey
C. theoblicki Yu & Li, 2019 – China
C. thorelli Roewer, 1951 – Indonesia (Sumatra)
C. tiantongensis Zhang, Yin & Kim, 1996 – China
C. tikaderi Majumder & Tikader, 1991 – India
C. tongdaoensis Zhang, Yin, Bao & Kim, 1997 – China, Korea
C. topakea Barrion & Litsinger, 1995 – Philippines
C. torta Forster, 1979 – New Zealand
C. tortuosa Zhang & Yin, 1998 – China
C. transbaicalica Mikhailov, 1992 – Russia (South Siberia)
C. transversa Zhang & Yin, 1998 – China
C. tridentata Dhali, Roy, Saha & Raychaudhuri, 2016 – India
C. trivialis C. L. Koch, 1843 – North America, Europe, Russia (Europe to Far East), China, Japan
C. tsurusakii Hayashi, 1987 – Russia (Kurile Is.), Japan
C. uenoi Ono, 1986 – Japan
C. umbilensis Lessert, 1923 – South Africa
C. unanoa Barrion & Litsinger, 1995 – Philippines
C. unikarta Barrion & Litsinger, 1995 – Philippines
C. upoluensis Marples, 1964 – Samoa
C. vachoni Lawrence, 1952 – South Africa
C. vacuna L. Koch, 1873 – New Guinea, Australia (Queensland)
C. valens Simon, 1897 – South Africa
C. venatoria Rainbow & Pulleine, 1920 – Australia (Lord Howe Is.)
C. venusae Barrion & Litsinger, 1995 – Philippines
C. venusta Paik, 1985 – China, Korea
C. victoriaensis Barrion & Litsinger, 1995 – Philippines
C. vigil Karsch, 1879 – Russia (Kurile Is.), Korea, Japan, China
C. vigillella Strand, 1918 – Japan
C. violaceovittata Schenkel, 1936 – China
C. vukomi Jäger & Dankittipakul, 2010 – Thailand, Laos
C. wolongica Zhu & An, 1999 – China
C. wulingensis Yu & Chen, 2017 – China
C. xinwenhui Barrion, Barrion-Dupo & Heong, 2013 – China
C. yaginumai Hayashi, 1989 – Taiwan, Japan
C. yangmingensis Hayashi & Yoshida, 1993 – Taiwan
C. yaoi Yu & Li, 2019 – China
C. yaroslavi Mikhailov, 2003 – Russia (Far East)
C. yasudai Ono, 1991 – Japan
C. yoshidai Hayashi, 1989 – Japan
C. yurii Mikhailov, 2011 – Mongolia
C. zacharovi Mikhailov, 1991 – Russia (Far East), Korea
C. zandstrai Barrion & Litsinger, 1995 – Philippines
C. zhangmuensis Hu & Li, 1987 – China
C. zhengi Yu & Li, 2019 – China
C. zhui Xu, Yang & Song, 2003 – China
C. zilla Dönitz & Strand, 1906 – Japan
C. zimmermanni Marples, 1964 – Samoa
C. zyuzini Mikhailov, 1995 – Russia (Far East)

See also
 List of Clubionidae species

References

Araneomorphae genera
Clubionidae
Cosmopolitan spiders
Taxa named by Pierre André Latreille